In algebraic geometry, the Grassmann d-plane bundle of a vector bundle E on an algebraic scheme X is a scheme over X:

For example,  is the projective bundle of E. In the other direction, a Grassmann bundle is a special case of a (partial) flag bundle. Concretely, the Grassmann bundle can be constructed as a Quot scheme.

Like the usual Grassmannian, the Grassmann bundle comes with natural vector bundles on it; namely, there are universal or tautological subbundle S and universal quotient bundle Q that fit into
.
Now, by the universal property of a projective bundle, the injection  corresponds to the morphism over X:
,
which is nothing but a family of Plücker embeddings.

The relative tangent bundle TGd(E)/X of Gd(E) is given by

which morally is given by the second fundamental form. In the case d = 1, it is given as follows: if V is a finite-dimensional vector space, then for each line  in V passing through the origin (a point of ), there is the natural identification (see Chern class#Complex projective space for example):

and the above is the family-version of this identification. (The general care is a generalization of this.)

In the case d = 1, the early exact sequence tensored with the dual of S = O(-1) gives:
,
which is the relative version of the Euler sequence.

References 

 

Algebraic geometry